Cocottes (or coquettes) were high class prostitutes (courtesans) in France during the Second Empire and the Belle Époque. They were also known as demi-mondes and grandes horizontales. Cocotte was originally a term of endearment for small children, but was used as a term for elegant prostitutes from the 1860s. The term was also used in Wilhelmine and Weimar Germany  from the turn of the 20th century (Kokotte).

Overview
For some women, becoming a cocotte was also a way to achieve financial comfort before settling down in marriage. Some managed their fortune, others died in misery, others finally, like Sarah Bernhardt, who in the beginning was a cocotte, became adulated actresses.

For a rich man of the period, keeping a cocotte was seen as a symbol of his status and virility. Cocottes were elegant, fashionable and extravagant, the papers reported on their clothing, parties and affairs. 

Several authors of the 19th century wrote about cocottes, for example Émile Zola with Nana. This novel describes the life and tragic fate of a street-walker who rises to become a cocotte, and whose ways lead to ruin the powerful men she meets.

Famous cocottes include Cora Pearl (1835-1886) (her patrons included Prince Napoleon and the Duke of Morny); Laure Hayman (1851-1932) (Paul Bourget, King of Greece, Prince Karageorgevich and Prince Karl of Fürstenberg). Several mansions of Paris were built for "cocottes", such as that of  la Païva on the Champs-Élysées.

References

Bibliography
 
 
 
 
 
 
 
 

Prostitution in France
Prostitution in Germany
Prostitutes by type
Courtesans by type
Belle Époque
Second French Empire